Priya Davdra (born 12 April 1987) is a British actress, known for portraying the role of Iqra Ahmed on the BBC soap opera EastEnders from 2019 to 2022. Davdra's character is the first Muslim lesbian to appear on EastEnders.

Early life
Davdra was born on 12 April 1987 in London, England. Davdra is British of Indian Gujarati descent and Hindu heritage. After leaving school, Davdra initially pursued a career in banking, a job she stayed in until the age of 30. From 2016 to 2017, she attended the International School of Screen Acting.

Career
While at drama school, Davdra made her professional acting career in the feature film Naan Yaar as lead role Shivani in 2016. Then in 2017, she appeared in a short film titled The Chapati Flower and an internet advertisement for Think. After making guest appearances in various projects, Davdra was cast as a series regular in the BBC soap opera EastEnders in December 2018. She made her first appearance as Iqra Ahmed on 19 February 2019. Davdra's character was involved in a coming out storyline where she became the first Muslim lesbian to appear on EastEnders. Davdra made her final appearance as Iqra in January 2022.

Filmography

References

External links
 
 
 

1987 births
21st-century English actresses
Actresses from London
Bankers from London
British actresses of Indian descent
English film actresses
English soap opera actresses
English stage actresses
Living people